The Best of Steve Forbert: What Kinda Guy? is a compilation album by singer/songwriter Steve Forbert. It was released by Sony Legacy in 1993. It collects fourteen tracks from Forbert's first four studio albums, recorded for Nemperor, a CBS imprint at the time, four live tracks from the eighties and one previously unreleased track, "Samson and Delilah's Beauty Shop".

Track listing
All songs written by Steve Forbert
"What Kinda Guy?" – 2:37
"Romeo's Tune" – 3:32
"Ya Ya (Next to Me)" – 3:48
"Cellophane City" – 5:36
"Song for Katrina" – 3:33
"The Sweet Love That You Give (Sure Goes A Long Long Way)" – 3:39
"I'm in Love with You" – 4:44
"Complications [live]" – 3:52
"You Cannot Win If You Do Not Play [live]" – 3:01
"Thinkin' [live]" – 4:04
"Goin' Down to Laurel" – 5:02
"January 23-30, 1978" – 4:27
"Get Well Soon" – 3:55
"Schoolgirl [live]" – 3:01
"Samson and Delilah's Beauty Shop" – 3:43
"The Oil Song" – 6:25
"Listen to Me" – 4:12
"Steve Forbert's Midsummer Night's Toast" – 2:50
"It Isn't Gonna Be That Way" – 4:58

References

Steve Forbert albums
1993 compilation albums